Möhnesee is a municipality in the district of Soest, in North Rhine-Westphalia, Germany.

Geography
The Möhnesee municipality is situated around the Möhne Reservoir (hence the name), approx. 10 km south of Soest.

History
On the night of the 16/17 May 1943, the Dam which contains the Mohnesee was breached in an attack by Avro Lancaster Bombers of 617 Squadron of the British Royal Air Force, the "Dambusters".

In the 1980s the Möhnesee hosted the Campingkirche.

Neighboring municipalities
 Arnsberg
 Bad Sassendorf
 Ense
 Soest 
 Warstein

Notable places

The Drueggelter Kapelle can be found at Möhnesee-Drüggelte. It is consecrated to the Holy Cross.

Subdivisions 
The municipality Möhnesee contains the following 18 subdivisions, with Körbecke as the largest:

References

External links
 Official site 

Lakes of North Rhine-Westphalia
Soest (district)